Pine Township may refer to the following places:

Arkansas
 Pine Township, Cleburne County, Arkansas

Indiana
 Pine Township, Benton County, Indiana
 Pine Township, Porter County, Indiana
 Pine Township, Warren County, Indiana

Michigan
 Pine Township, Michigan

Missouri
 Pine Township, Ripley County, Missouri

Pennsylvania
 Pine Township, Allegheny County, Pennsylvania
 Pine Township, Armstrong County, Pennsylvania
 Pine Township, Mercer County, Pennsylvania
 Pine Township, Lycoming County, Pennsylvania
 Pine Township, Indiana County, Pennsylvania
 Pine Township, Crawford County, Pennsylvania
 Pine Township, Columbia County, Pennsylvania
 Pine Township, Clearfield County, Pennsylvania

Township name disambiguation pages